Thalles Gabriel Morais dos Reis (born 3 January 1998), known simply as Thalles, is a Brazilian professional footballer who plays as a attacking midfielder for Série A club Goiás.

Club career
Thalles made his professional debut with Goiás in a 1-1 Campeonato Brasileiro Série B tie with Fluminense FC on 21 May 2016. After a spell on loan at Brasil de Pelotas, Thalles moved out on loan again in February 2021, this time joining Ponte Preta.

Honours
Goiás
Campeonato Goiano: 2016, 2017, 2018

References

External links
 
 Thalles at playmakerstats.com (English version of ogol.com.br)

1998 births
Living people
Sportspeople from Minas Gerais
Brazilian footballers
Association football midfielders
Goiás Esporte Clube players
Campeonato Brasileiro Série A players
Campeonato Brasileiro Série B players
Grêmio Esportivo Brasil players